Thomas Cole (1801–1848) was an American artist.

Thomas Cole may also refer to:

Politicians
Thomas Cole (died 1413), MP for Weymouth
Thomas Cole (MP for Melcombe Regis) 1399–1407, MP for Melcombe Regis
Thomas Cole (died 1681) (1622–1681), MP for Winchester
Tom Cole (born 1949), American Republican politician
Thomas Loftus Cole (1877–1961), Unionist politician in Northern Ireland

Sports
Tom Cole (umpire) (1844–1924), Australian cricket umpire
Tom Cole (footballer) (born 1997), Australian rules footballer
Tom Cole (rower) (born c. 1827), English rower
Tom Cole (racing driver) (1922–1953), British racing driver
Thomas Cole (cricketer) (1846–1900), English cricketer

Others
Thomas Cole (archdeacon of Essex) (died 1571), English Protestant churchman
Thomas Cole (minister) (1628–1697), English Independent
Thomas Cole (dean of Norwich) (died 1731), Anglican priest
Thomas Cole (printmaker) (1852–1931), British-born American wood engraver
Thomas F. Cole (businessman) (1862–1939), mining executive
SS Thomas F.Cole
Thomas F. Cole (general), United States Army general
Thomas R. Cole (born 1949), writer, historian, filmmaker, and gerontologist
Tom Cole (writer) (1933–2009), playwright and screenwriter
Tom Cole (farmer) (1854–1927), Australian dairy farmer and cattle breeder
Tom Cole (stockman) (1906–1995), Australian stockman and writer
Tommy Cole (born 1941), American make-up artist

See also
Thomas Cole Mountain
Thomas Cole House, the home and the studio of painter Thomas Cole
Tom Onslow-Cole (born 1987), British racing driver
Cole (name)